Malcolm Owen Markillie (14 December 1880 – 9 March 1945) was an Australian rules footballer who played with St Kilda in the Victorian Football League (VFL).

He later owned a hotel in Malvern and owned racehorses.

References

External links 

1880 births
1945 deaths
Australian rules footballers from Ballarat
St Kilda Football Club players
Caulfield Football Club players
Australian hoteliers